Walter James Edwards (1900 – 15 October 1964), known as Stoker Edwards or Wally Edwards, was a British Labour Party politician.

Edwards was born in Whitechapel, in the East End of London. He briefly worked as a carman from 1917 and in 1918 enlisted in the Royal Navy as a stoker and served until 1923. He then became a docker. He joined the Labour Party and the Transport and General Workers' Union and in 1937 was appointed a full-time officer with the union's Docks Group. From 1935 to 1939 he was chairman of the Whitechapel Labour Party.

In the Second World War he was recalled as a Naval reservist and rose to the rate of Leading Stoker. In 1942 he was elected as Member of Parliament (MP) for Whitechapel and St Georges, the first serving Royal Navy rating to be elected to Parliament. Following boundary changes in 1950, he was elected for the new Stepney constituency and served until his retirement in 1964. He served as Civil Lord of the Admiralty from 1945 to 1951. A devout Roman Catholic, he was known as a campaigner against prostitution, which was a big problem in his constituency. He died on the day of the 1964 general election.

Edwards was elected to Stepney Borough Council in 1934 and served on it until 1959. In 1944–1945, when he was already an MP, he served as mayor. Edwards' only son was killed on active service in 1944. He also had a daughter.

References
Obituary, TGWU Record, December 1964
Obituary, The Times, 16 October 1964

External links 
 

1900 births
1964 deaths
Labour Party (UK) MPs for English constituencies
Lords of the Admiralty
Transport and General Workers' Union-sponsored MPs
UK MPs 1935–1945
UK MPs 1945–1950
UK MPs 1950–1951
UK MPs 1951–1955
UK MPs 1955–1959
UK MPs 1959–1964
People from Whitechapel
Royal Navy sailors
Royal Navy personnel of World War I
Royal Navy personnel of World War II
Trade unionists from London
Mayors of places in Greater London
English Roman Catholics
Members of Stepney Metropolitan Borough Council
Admiralty personnel of World War II
Ministers in the Attlee governments, 1945–1951